Winder Russell Harris (December 3, 1888 – February 24, 1973) was an American journalist, civil servant, and politician who served as a U.S. Representative from Virginia from 1941 to 1944.

Early life and career
Born in Wake County (now a part of Raleigh), North Carolina, Harris attended the public schools and St. Mary's College (now Belmont Abbey College), Belmont, North Carolina.

He served in various editorial positions on newspapers in North Carolina and Virginia from 1908 to 1918. He then turned to a career in civil service, working as a member of the staff of Universal Service in Washington, D.C. from 1918 to 1925. He served as assistant secretary to the American delegation to the International Narcotics Congress in Geneva, Switzerland, in 1924 and 1925. Returning to journalism, he was managing editor of the Virginian-Pilot, Norfolk, Virginia from 1925 to 1941.

U.S. House
Harris was elected as a Democrat to the Seventy-seventh Congress, on April 8, 1941 in a special election to fill the vacancy caused by the resignation of Colgate W. Darden, Jr. He was re-elected to the Seventy-eighth Congress and served until his resignation on September 15, 1944.

After Congress
He was the vice president of the Shipbuilders' Council of America, in Washington, D.C., until his retirement on December 31, 1958. He also served as vice chairman of the Board of Commissioners of the Alexandria Redevelopment and Housing Authority from September 1955 until his resignation in November 1961.

He was editor of the Alexandria Journal, the Arlington Journal, and the Fairfax County Journal-Standard until his retirement in March 1966.

Retirement and death
He resided in Alexandria, Virginia, until his death on February 24, 1973.
He was interred in Oakwood Cemetery, Raleigh, North Carolina.

His grandson, David S. Bill III, became a Rear Admiral in the United States Navy.

Electoral history

1941; Harris was elected to Congress defeating Independent Democrat Norman P. Hamilton, Independent Maurice S. McCarty, and Prohibitionist Andrew J. Dunning, Jr., winning 49.17% of the vote.
1942; Harris was re-elected unopposed.

Sources

1888 births
1973 deaths
Belmont Abbey College alumni
People from Wake County, North Carolina
Politicians from Norfolk, Virginia
20th-century American newspaper editors
American male journalists
Democratic Party members of the United States House of Representatives from Virginia
Journalists from North Carolina
Journalists from Virginia
Burials at Historic Oakwood Cemetery
20th-century American politicians